The Diocese of Fargo is a Latin Church ecclesiastical territory or diocese of the Catholic Church in North Dakota, United States. The cathedra is found within the Cathedral of St. Mary, in the episcopal see of Fargo. It is a suffragan in the ecclesiastical province of the metropolitan Archdiocese of Saint Paul and Minneapolis.

History 
The diocese was founded on November 10, 1889 by Pope Leo XIII as the "Diocese of Jamestown."  The name of the diocese was changed to the Diocese of Fargo on April 6, 1897, and the Diocese of Jamestown was made into a titular see.
 
It lost territory when the Diocese of Bismarck was established by Pope Pius X in 1909.

Bishops

Bishops of Fargo
 John Shanley (1889–1909)
 James O'Reilly (1909–1934)
 Aloisius Joseph Muench (1935–1959), appointed Apostolic Nuncio and Titular Archbishop (elevated to Cardinal in 1959)
 Leo Ferdinand Dworschak (1960–1970)
 Justin Albert Driscoll (1970–1984)
 James Stephen Sullivan (1985–2002)
 Samuel Joseph Aquila (2002–2012), appointed Archbishop of Denver
 John Thomas Folda (2013–present)

Other bishops who once were priests of the Diocese of Fargo
 Raymond W. Lessard, appointed Bishop of Savannah in 1973
 William Theodore Mulloy, appointed Bishop of Covington in 1944
 Vincent James Ryan, appointed Bishop of Bismarck in 1940

Departments 
The Diocese of Fargo operates a number of departments serving the various needs of the bishop and parishes. The departments include:

Archives
Catholic Education and Formation Office (CEF)
Catholic Schools
Cemeteries
Communications
Evangelization 
Catechesis
Finance
Human Resources
Marriage & Family Life
Marriage Tribunal
Properties Management
Respect Life
Stewardship & Development
Technology
Youth & Young Adult

Parishes 
A partial list of parishes of the Diocese of Fargo follows.
 St. Joseph's Chapel, Minto

Deanery 1: South-East
Dean: Very Reverend Dale Lagodinski

 Holy Trinity Church, Fingal
 Our Lady of the Scapular Church, Sheldon
 St. Aloysius Church, Lisbon
 St. Anthony's Church, Fairmount
 St. Anthony's Church, Mooreton
 St. Arnold's Church, Milnor
 St. Boniface Church, Lidgerwood
 St. Charles Church, Oakes
 St. John the Baptist Church, Wyndmere

 St. John's Church, Wahpeton
 St. Martin's Church, Geneseo
 St. Mary's Church, Forman
 St. Patrick's Church, Enderlin
 St. Philip's Church, Hankinson
 St. Vincent's Church, Gwinner
 Sts. Peter and Paul's Church, Cayuga
 Sts. Peter and Paul's Church, Mantador

Deanery 2: Fargo
Dean: Very Reverend Paul Duchschere

 Blessed Sacrament Church, West Fargo
 Cathedral of St. Mary, Fargo
 Holy Cross Church, West Fargo
 Holy Spirit Church, Fargo
 Nativity Church, Fargo
 St. Anthony's Church, Fargo

 St. Benedict's Church, Wild Rice
 St. Leo's Church, Casselton
 St. Maurice Church, Kindred
 St. Paul's Newman Center, Fargo
 St. Thomas Church, Buffalo
 Sts. Anne and Joachim Catholic Church (Fargo), Fargo

Deanery 3: Grand Forks
Dean: N/A

 Holy Family Church, Grand Forks
 Our Lady of Peace Church, Mayville
 Our Lady of Perpetual Help Church, Reynolds
 St. Agnes Church, Hunter
 St. Jude's Church, Thompson
 St. Mary's Church, Grand Forks

 St. Michael's Church, Grand Forks
 St. Rose Catholic Church, Hillsboro
 St. Stephen's Church, Larimore
 St. Thomas Newman Center, Grand Forks
 St. Timothy's Church, Manvel
 St. William's Church, Argusville

Deanery 4: North-East
Dean:N/A

 Assumption Church, Pembina
 Sacred Heart Church, Minto
 Sacred Heart Church, Oakwood
 St. Alphonsus Church, Langdon
 St. Boniface Church, Walhalla
 St. Brigid's Church, Cavalier
 St. Edward's Church, Drayton
 St. Edward's Church, Nekoma
 St. John Nepomucene Church, Pisek

 St. John's Church, Grafton
 St. Joseph's Church, Lankin
 St. Luke's Church, Veseleyville
 St. Mary's Church, Park River
 St. Michael's Church, Wales
 St. Patrick's Church, Crystal
 St. Stanislaus Church, Warsaw
 Sts. Nereus and Archilleus Church, Neche
 Sts. Peter and Paul's Church, Bechyne

Deanery 5: Devils Lake
Dean: Very Reverend Chad Wilhelm

 Assumption Church, Starkweather
 Christ the King Church, Tokio
 Sacred Heart Church, Cando
 Seven Dolors Mission, Fort Totten
 St. Jerome's Church, Crow Hill
 St. John's Church, New Rockford
 St. Joseph's Church, Devils Lake
 St. Joseph's Church, Tolna

 St. Lawrence O'Toole's Catholic Church, Michigan
 St. Mary's Catholic Church, Munich
 St. Mary's Catholic Church, Lakota
 St. Michael's Mission, Devils Lake
 St. Vincent de Paul's Catholic Church, Leeds
 Sts. Peter and Paul's Catholic Church, McHenry

Deanery 6: North-West 
Dean: Very Reverend Frank Miller

 Holy Family Church, McClusky
 Holy Rosary Church, Bisbee
 Immaculate Heart of Mary Church, Rock Lake
 Notre Dame Church, Willow City
 Our Lady of Mt. Carmel Church, Balta
 Sacred Heart Church, Rolette
 St. Andrew's Church, Westhope
 St. Ann's Church, Belcourt
 St. Anthony's Church, Alcide
 St. Anthony's Church, Selz
 St. Augustine's Church, Fessenden
 St. Benedict's Church, Belcourt
 St. Boniface Church, Esmond

 St. Cecilia's Church, Harvey
 St. Cecilia's Church, Towner
 St. Francis Xavier's Church, Anamoose
 St. Joachim's Church, Rolla
 St. John's Church, St. John
 St. Margaret Mary's Church, Drake
 St. Mark's Church, Bottineau
 St. Mary's Church, Knox
 St. Michael's Church, Dunseith
 St. Therese Church, Rugby
 St. William's Church, Maddock
 Sts. Peter and Pauls Church, Karlsruhe

Deanery 7: Jamestown-Valley City
Dean: Very Reverend Msgr. Dennis Skonseng

 Sacred Heart Catholic Church, Carrington
 Sacred Heart Church, Aneta
 Sacred Heart Church, Sanborn
 St. Agatha's Church, Hope
 St. Bernard's Church, Oriska
 St. Boniface Church, Wimbledon
 St. Catherine's Church, Valley City
 St Elizabeth's Church, Sykeston

 St. George's Church, Cooperstown
 St. James Basilica, Jamestown
 St. John's Church, Kensal
 St. Lawrence Church, Jessie
 St. Margaret Mary's Church, Buchanan
 St. Mary's Church, Dazey
 St. Mathias Church, Windsor
 St. Olaf's Church, Finley

Deanery 8: South-West
Dean: Very Reverend Wenceslaus Katanga

 Assumption Church, Dickey
 Holy Rosary Church, LaMoure
 Holy Spirit Church, Nortonville
 St. Andrew's Church, Zeeland
 St. David's Church, Ashley
 St. Francis Church, Steele
 St. Helena's Church, Ellendale

 St. Mary's Church, Medina
 St. Patrick's Church, Fullerton
 St. Paul's Church, Tappen
 St Philip's Church, Napoleon
 St. Raphael's Church, Venora
 Transfiguration Church, Edgeley

Education

Schools

Former schools 
The Diocese of Fargo operated Cardinal Muench Seminary, established in 1962, for the formation of men to the priesthood. The seminary was closed in May 2011 due to increased cost of operation and lack of funding.
 St. Alphonsus High School
 St. Mary's Elementary School

Coat of arms

Accusations of clergy sexual abuse
On January 2, 2020, the Diocese of Fargo unveiled the names of 31 clergy who, since 1950, were "credibly accused" of sexually abusing children while serving in the Diocese. Among those named were Rev Richard Sinner, brother of former North Dakota Governor George A. Sinner. Rev. Richard Sinner was an outspoken activist for aiding Central American refugees, abolishing nuclear weapons, and promoting music and song.

See also 

 Catholic Church by country
 Catholic Church in the United States
 Ecclesiastical Province of Saint Paul and Minneapolis
 Global organisation of the Catholic Church
 List of Roman Catholic archdioceses (by country and continent)
 List of Catholic dioceses (alphabetical) (including archdioceses)
 List of Catholic dioceses (structured view) (including archdioceses)
 List of the Catholic dioceses of the United States

Notes

External links 

 Roman Catholic Diocese of Fargo Official Site

 
Fargo
Diocese of Fargo
Religious organizations established in 1889
1889 establishments in Dakota Territory
Fargo
Fargo